Ronald D. Ghitter  (born August 22, 1935) is a Canadian lawyer and politician. He served as a member of the Legislative Assembly of Alberta from August 30, 1971 to March 13, 1979 sitting with the governing Progressive Conservative caucus. Ghitter was appointed to the Senate of Canada on March 25, 1993 where he sat as a senator from Alberta until his retirement on March 31, 2000.

Life and career
Born in Calgary, Alberta, he received his Bachelor of Arts degree in 1956 and his Bachelor of Law degree in 1959 from the University of Alberta. He practised real estate law in Calgary. From 1986 to 1988, he was Executive Vice President of Development at Trizec Corporation.

He was first elected as a member of the Legislative Assembly of Alberta for the electoral district of Calgary-Buffalo in the 1971 Alberta general election, defeating popular Calgary Stampeders star Don Luzzi from the Alberta Social Credit Party in a very tight race. He was elected again in 1975 and then retired, having served two terms. As a member of the Progressive Conservative caucus, Ghitter was a critic of many decisions made by his party, including purchasing Pacific Western Airlines and the governments use of the Alberta Heritage Savings Trust Fund. Ghitter announced he would not retire from the legislature in November 1978, and not contest the upcoming 1979 Alberta general election.

Following revelations that Eckville school teacher James Keegstra had taught his students anti-semitic propaganda, Ghitter headed a Committee on Tolerance and Understanding. The committee investigated issues of tolerance and understanding within the educational system. This committee released its report to the government in 1984.

Ghitter re-entered politics in 1985 to run for the leadership of the Progressive Conservative Party but came in third losing to Don Getty.
  
He was appointed to the Senate in 1993 representing the senatorial division of Alberta. From 1996 to 1999, he was the Chair of the Senate Standing Committee of Energy, the Environment and Natural Resources. Sitting as a Progressive Conservative, he resigned in 2000.

In 1990, he was awarded the Alberta Human Rights Award. He was awarded the Order of Canada on May 11, 2018 for his work on human rights legislation and various social issues.

Electoral record

1975 general election

Party leadership contest

References

External links
 
 

1935 births
Living people
Canadian senators from Alberta
Jewish Canadian politicians
Members of the Order of Canada
Politicians from Calgary
Progressive Conservative Association of Alberta MLAs
Progressive Conservative Party of Canada senators
University of Alberta alumni
University of Alberta Faculty of Law alumni